Whitemarsh Township is a Home rule municipality in Montgomery County, Pennsylvania, United States. It retains its former classification of "Township" in its official name despite being a home rule municipality. The population was 17,349 at the 2010 census. Whitemarsh is adjacent to the neighborhood of Andorra in the Roxborough section of Philadelphia, and is bordered in Montgomery County by Springfield, Upper Dublin, Whitpain, and Plymouth townships, and by Conshohocken Borough. It is also bordered by the Schuylkill River, which separates it from Lower Merion Township. Communities within Whitemarsh Township include: Barren Hill; Lafayette Hill; part of Miquon, which straddles Whitemarsh and Springfield townships, Spring Mill; part of Plymouth Meeting (which straddles Whitemarsh and Plymouth townships); and part of Fort Washington, some of which is in Whitemarsh, but which is chiefly in Upper Dublin Township.

History

Whitemarsh was originally inhabited by the Lenni Lenape tribe of Native Americans. It was first settled by European colonists in 1683. At that time, Whitemarsh was part of a tract of land that Major Jasper Farmar had purchased from William Penn. Farmar died shortly thereafter, before making the voyage across the ocean to settle on his newly purchased land. But his widow and family, with servants, sailed to Philadelphia in 1685, and established their homestead on the part of their land that lay in nearby Fort Washington. After the Widow Farmar died (sometime in the 1690s), her son Edward began to sell 100- to 200-acre parcels of their Whitemarsh land to Quakers and German immigrants.

In 1686, the discovery of limestone in Oreland (which extends across nearby Springfield and Upper Dublin townships), and subsequent discoveries of limestone in the township itself, drew new settlers to Whitemarsh. In 1704, Whitemarsh Township was incorporated. At that time, it was located in Philadelphia County. In 1784, Montgomery County was created, and Whitemarsh was made part of it, becoming one of the new county's 28 original communities. Throughout the 1600s and 1700s, Whitemarsh was characterized by large English estates and by its famous limestone quarries.

During the American Revolutionary War, both the Battle of White Marsh and the Battle of Barren Hill took place within the township.

National Register of Historic Places 
Cold Point Historic District
Alan West Corson Homestead
County Bridge No. 54 
Farmar Mill
The Highlands
Hope Lodge
Hovenden House, Barn and Abolition Hall
Lee Tire and Rubber Company
Miller's House at Spring Mill
Mount Joy
Plymouth Meeting Historic District
Union School

Geography
According to the United States Census Bureau, the township has a total area of 14.7 square miles (38.1 km2), of which 14.6 square miles (37.8 km2) is land, and 0.1 square miles (0.3 km2) (0.68%) is water.

For purposes of the U.S. Census, there are two so-called “census-designated places” that include parts of Whitemarsh. The Census Bureau has labeled these areas  “Plymouth Meeting,” and “Fort Washington.”

Demographics

As of the 2010 census, Whitemarsh Township was 90.7% White, 3.5% Black or African American, 0.1% Native American, 4.2% Asian, and 1.2% were two or more races. 1.7% of the population were of Hispanic or Latino ancestry .

As of the census of 2000, there were 16,702 people, 6,179 households, and 4,597 families residing in the township.  The population density was 1,143.5 people per square mile (441.4/km2).  There were 6,372 housing units at an average density of 436.3 per square mile (168.4/km2).  The racial makeup of the township was 93.29% White, 2.21% African American, 0.02% Native American, 3.70% Asian, 0.14% from other races, and 0.63% from two or more races. Hispanics or Latinos of any race were 0.99% of the population.

There were 6,179 households, out of which 34.4% had children under the age of 18 living with them, 64.4% were married couples living together, 7.1% had a female householder with no husband present, and 25.6% were non-families. 20.8% of all households were made up of individuals, and 7.3% had someone living alone who was 65 years of age or older.  The average household size was 2.62 and the average family size was 3.06.

The age distribution was 24.3% under the age of 18, 5.0% from 18 to 24, 29.8% from 25 to 44, 25.1% from 45 to 64, and 15.7% who were 65 years of age or older.  The median age was 40 years. For every 100 females there were 93.7 males.  For every 100 females age 18 and over, there were 89.6 males.

The median income for a household in the township was $78,630, and the median income for a family was $91,731. Males had a median income of $58,774 versus $41,977 for females. The per capita income for the township was $39,785.  About 1.6% of families and 2.9% of the population were below the poverty line, including 1.8% of those under age 18 and 3.1% of those age 65 or over.

Government

Whitemarsh Township is governed by a five-member Board of Supervisors elected to four-year terms.  As of 2019, the board members are Chair Melissa Sterling (D), Vice-chair Amy Grossman (D), Michael Drossner (D), Laura Boyle Nester (D) and Fran McCusker (D).

Recreation
Fort Washington State Park is a  area in the middle of the township along the Wissahickon Creek.

Miles Park, at the intersection of Germantown Pike and Joshua Road, has basketball courts, baseball fields, a walking track, a snack bar, and vending machines.

Several country clubs have grounds within the town: the Whitemarsh Valley Country Club, the ACE Club, and the Green Valley Club (which each have one golf course), and the Philadelphia Cricket Club (which has two golf courses).

Education
The Colonial School District provides public education to the children of Whitemarsh Township.

Transportation

The east–west Pennsylvania Turnpike (Interstate 276) and the north-south Fort Washington Expressway (Pennsylvania Route 309) run through the township. Although neither has an interchange in Whitemarsh, the turnpike has an interchange in nearby Plymouth Township, and the Route 309 expressway has an interchange in nearby Fort Washington that also connects with the turnpike. Arterial roads in the township include Ridge Pike, Germantown Pike, Butler Pike, Skippack Pike (Pennsylvania Route 73), Bethlehem Pike, Stenton Avenue, Pennsylvania Avenue, Joshua Road, and Morris Road.

Two SEPTA Regional Rail lines serves the township. The Lansdale/Doylestown line, which connects Bucks, Montgomery, and Philadelphia counties, has a station on the easternmost side of the township: the Fort Washington station. And the Manayunk/Norristown line, which runs along the Schuylkill River, has two stations on the westernmost side of the township: one in Miquon and another, farther north, in Spring Mill. 

Since December 21, 2017, OurBus has provided Whitemarsh Township with intercity bus service, as part of a route that runs from West Chester, Pennsylvania, to Park Avenue on Manhattan Island in New York City. The bus stop in Fort Washington is adjacent to the Fort Washington railroad station.

Norfolk Southern Railway's Morrisville Line, which carries only freight, passes through Whitemarsh Township, running parallel to the southern side of the Pennsylvania Turnpike.

There are no airports in Whitemarsh Township. The closest airport is the Wings Field in Whitpain Township.

See also
National Register of Historic Places listings in Montgomery County, Pennsylvania
Great Train Wreck of 1856
St. Thomas' Church, Whitemarsh
Erdenheim Farm

Locale

References

External links

 Whitemarsh Township
 living places page
 Lafayette Hill and Whitemarsh News & Events

Home Rule Municipalities in Montgomery County, Pennsylvania
Townships in Montgomery County, Pennsylvania